Machelhe Island is a river island on the Pasquotank River in Camden County, North Carolina, in the United States.

The island's name is a conjoin of Mary, Charles, Eloise, and Helen, the children of the original owner of the site.

References

River islands of North Carolina
Landforms of Camden County, North Carolina